Gil Puyat station (sometimes called Buendia station) is an elevated Manila Light Rail Transit (LRT) station situated on Line 1. The station is located in Pasay and is named because the station lies immediately above Gil Puyat Avenue. The avenue itself is named after Gil Puyat, a former senator and statesman.

Gil Puyat station is the fourth station for trains headed to Roosevelt, the seventeenth station for trains headed to Baclaran, and is one of the four Line 1 stations serving Pasay, the others are Libertad, EDSA and Baclaran.

The station is a major transfer point for passengers bound for the Makati Central Business District.

Transportation links
Bus terminal for both city and provincial buses lie beside the station. Buses that ply the Buendia (Gil Puyat) route stop there, as well as buses to Batangas, Laguna, Quezon, and Marinduque. Buses that ply the Taft Avenue route also stop near the station.

Taxis, jeepneys, and tricycles also stop near the station, serving commuters that live farther away from the station.

A terminal for UV Express vans bound for SM City Fairview also lies beside the station's east entrance.

The nearest PNR and MRT stations are located further along Gil Puyat Avenue, all located in Makati.

See also

List of rail transit stations in Metro Manila
Manila Light Rail Transit System

Manila Light Rail Transit System stations
Railway stations opened in 1984
Buildings and structures in Pasay